The Stardust Superstar of Tomorrow - Male is chosen by a distinguished jury as part of the annual Stardust magazine. The award honours a star that has made an impact with their acting and represents new talent.

Here is a list of the award winners and the films for which they won.

See also 
 Stardust Awards
 Bollywood
 Cinema of India

References 

Stardust Awards